Rajshahi Royals (Varendri/) were a Bangladeshi franchise Twenty20 cricket team. The team was based in Rajshahi in Bangladesh and competed in the Bangladesh Premier League (BPL), a Twenty20 franchise cricket competition.

On 16 November 2019, Bengal Group was named as the sponsor of the team and it was renamed to Bengal Rajshahi Royals. The team was excluded from 2021–22 Bangladesh Premier League.

History
Duronto Rajshahi participated in the first two seasons of the Bangladesh Premier League in 2011/12 and 2012/13. Following the suspension of all BPL franchises after the second season of the league, the Rajshahi Kings were formed in advance of the 2016/17 Bangladesh Premier League following a complete change in the team ownership and management. They  competed in the fourth edition of the BPL in late 2016, losing in the final to the  Dhaka Dynamites. On 6 October 2016, Darren Sammy was announced the captain of the side.

Season overview

2011/12

Duronto Rajshahi was captained by Mushfiqur Rahim and had the likes of Marlon Samuels, Sabbir Rahman and Mohammad Sami by his side. The team dominated during the league stage, winning 7 of their 10 games, finished at the top of the leaderboard. However, they lost to Barisal Burners in the semi-final, ending a positive campaign.

2012/13

This time, the team was led by Tamim Iqbal who had the likes of Moeen Ali and Sean Ervine accompanying him. This time, Rajshahi just managed to finish in the top 4 during the league stage, winning 5 games out of 12 matches. Their campaign ended as they were disqualified during the playoffs.

2016/17

The kings were the other new team alongside Khulna Titans participating this year. They signed Mohammad Sami and Darren Sammy (who was, later on, made the skipper) pre-draft. As they were one of the new teams, the kings were allowed to select two local cricketers in the draft before the initial procedure. They selected Mehedi Hasan and Nurul Hasan. They signed Sri Lankan opener Upul Tharanga (missed whole tournament due to national commitments), English all-rounder Samit Patel and more from the overseas department in the draft. They bought   Mominul Haque, Farhad Reza and some more local talents also from the draft. They also signed Kiwi all-rounder James Franklin and Jamaican seamer Kesrick Williams mid-tournament. They chose hard-hitting t20 specialist batting all-rounder Sabbir Rahman as their icon player.

The kings started off with a 3 run defeat to Khulna Titans and lost to Barisal Bulls (Sabbir 122) in a nail-biting finish. They notched up crucial victories against Dhaka Dynamites (did so twice) and Khulna Titans to qualify for the playoffs.

They won against Chittagong Vikings and Khulna Titans in the eliminator and the 2nd qualifier game respectively.
Unfortunately, the suffered a heavy defeat against Dhaka Dynamites in the final.

2017/18

They replaced previous icon Sabbir Rahman with wicket-keeper batsman Mushfiqur Rahim as the icon player and retained Mominul Haque, Farhad Reza and Mehedi Hasan. They signed English opener and part-time seamer Luke Wright and West Indian top-middle order batsmen Lendl Simmons to provide stability to the top order and also made a one-season contract with Zimbabwe's Malcolm Waller to give  the lower-middle order a boost. They extended the contract for one more year with Franklin, Sami and Sammy (remade skipper).

In the draft, The Kings got the first pick in the lottery and unsurprisingly selected wiry left-arm seamer Mustafizur Rahman. They were riding their luck as they also gained the first pick in the overseas selection in the draft, picking Pakistani leggie Usama Mir.
The surprise picks were U19 all-rounder Qazi Onik, in-form orthodox spinner Nihaduzzaman, pacer Hossain Ali and little known Pakistani all-rounder Raza Ali Dar.

The Kings began their conquest with a lost to Rangpur Riders and could not fully recover from the early defeat. They went on to lose more matches but secured some victories on the way. Overall, they finished 2nd last at 6th.

2018/19

They retained Mominul Haque, Zakir Hasan, Mehedi Hasan, Mustafizur Rahman and Mohammad Sami. They signed Afghan leg-spinner Qais Ahmad and South African Christiaan Jonker pre-draft

In the draft, Rajshahi snatched in-form batsman Soumya Sarkar as their first pick. From the overseas department, they signed the likes of Isuru Udana and Ryan ten Doeschate. Their Head Coach Lance Klusener was present in the event.

2019/20

The team signed South African Al-rounder JP Duminy as one of their direct signings. But later, BCB decided to run this edition of the BPL themselves without taking any franchises, which meant the new signing could not represent this team on this edition of the tournament.

However, During the player's direct signing period, a Conflict of Interests aroused between BCB and all other franchise. Subsequently, in September 2019, BCB made some changes in rules and regulations for this season and eliminating all franchises, BCB took over the charge of the current BPL and decided to run this current tournament by the board itself and named the tournament as Bangabandhu BPL T20 2019 in order to pay homage to Sheikh Mujibur Rahman on his birth centenary. IPC Group became the team sponsor. They renamed it to ‘Rajshahi Royals’.
In November 2019, post players draft, Shoaib Malik and Andre Russell were included in Rajshahi Royals team in the 2019-20 Bangladesh Premier League.

Records

Kit manufacturers and sponsors

Current squad
 Players with international caps are listed in bold.
  denotes a player who is currently unavailable for selection.
  denotes a player who is unavailable for rest of the season

Administration and Support Staff
 Head coach:-  Owais Shah
 Assistant coach:-  Rajin Saleh
 Team Director:-  Akram Khan
 Team Manager:-  Hannan Sarkar
 Team Sponsor:- Bengal

References

External links 
 Website

Bangladesh Premier League teams
Sports clubs in Bangladesh
Cricket in Rajshahi
Sport in Rajshahi
Former senior cricket clubs of Bangladesh